The Magdeburg-Stendal University of Applied Sciences is a public university of applied sciences with two locations. One location is situated in Magdeburg, the capital city of Saxony-Anhalt and the other one is located in Stendal.

History

Since the university's founding in 1991, there are nowadays approximately 50 study programmes at three faculties in Magdeburg and two faculties in Stendal. There are around 3.700 students in Magdeburg and 1.800 in Stendal.

Academic degrees
The university offers German and English courses leading to academic degrees such as BA, BSc, MA, MSc and doctoral degrees.

References

External links

  

Universities and colleges in Saxony-Anhalt